Ryan Michael Hollingshead (born April 16, 1991) is an American professional soccer player who plays as a right-back for Major League Soccer club Los Angeles FC.

Career

College
Hollingshead played college soccer at UCLA between 2009 and 2012. At UCLA, he played in 81 matches, scoring 16 goals and recording 21 assists (53 points). He earned All-Pac-12 honors three times in his career (2010–12) and was named the 2012 Pac-12 Player of the Year. In addition, Hollingshead earned NSCAA All-America honors in 2012 and was named to the 2011 NCAA All-Tournament Team after leading the Bruins to the College Cup semifinals. In 2012, he started all 19 of UCLA’s matches, led the team with 22 points (7 goals, 8 assists), and finished the season tied for the team lead in goals. Hollingshead also captained the Bruins to a 13–3–3 record and finished second in the Pac-12 with 8 assists for the year.

Professional
FC Dallas selected Hollingshead in the second round (20th overall) of the 2013 MLS SuperDraft. Despite an offer from Dallas, Hollingshead opted not to accept, so that he could help his brother build a church in Sacramento and spend time in Haiti doing charity work at an orphanage.

Hollingshead signed with Dallas on December 9, 2013. Over the next few seasons, he established himself as a player who could play multiple positions, mostly as a fullback or wing on either side.

On January 6, 2017, while stopping to help a stranded motorist, Hollingshead was struck by a motor vehicle that had crashed due to icy conditions, launching him 30 feet into the air. He sustained three broken vertebrae in his neck as a result of the collision. The injuries forced him to miss the start of the 2017 season. After the season, he was recognized as the MLS WORKS Humanitarian of the Year.

On February 10, 2022, Hollingshead was acquired by Los Angeles FC from FC Dallas in exchange for Marco Farfan.

Career statistics

Club

Honors 
FC Dallas
Supporters' Shield: 2016
Lamar Hunt U.S. Open Cup: 2016

Los Angeles FC
MLS Cup: 2022
Supporters' Shield: 2022

Individual
MLS Humanitarian of the Year: 2017

References

External links
 
 UCLA bio

1991 births
Living people
American soccer players
Association football midfielders
FC Dallas draft picks
FC Dallas players
Los Angeles FC players
Major League Soccer players
People from Granite Bay, California
Soccer players from California
Sportspeople from Greater Sacramento
UCLA Bruins men's soccer players